Pristurus  phillipsii, known commonly as Phillip's rock gecko or the Somali rock gecko, is a species of lizard in the family Sphaerodactylidae. The species is endemic to the Horn of Africa.

Etymology
The specific name, phillipsii, is in honor of British naturalist Ethelbert Lort Phillips.

Geographic range
P. phillipsii is found in Somalia. The Reptile Databases lists it also from Ethiopia.

Reproduction
P. phillipsii is oviparous.

References

Further reading
Arnold EN (2009). "Relationships, evolution and biogeography of Semaphore geckos, Pristurus (Squamata, Sphaerodactylidae) based on morphology". Zootaxa 2060: 1-21.
Boulenger GA (1895). "On the Reptiles and Batrachians obtained by Mr. E. Lort-Phillips in Somaliland". Annals and Magazine of Natural History, Sixth Series 16: 165-169 + Plate VII. (Pristurus phillipsii, new species, pp. 165–166 + Plate VII, figures 1, 1a).
Calabresi E (1915). "Contributo alla conoscenza dei Rettili della Somalia ". Monitore Zoologico Italiano 28: 234–247. (Pristurus phillipsii, pp. 235–236). (in Italian).
Mazuch, Tomáš (2013). Amphibians and Reptiles of Somaliland and Eastern Ethiopia. Dřiteč, Czech Republic: Tomáš Mazuch Publishing. 80 pp. .
Rösler H (2000). "Kommentierte Liste der rezent, subrezent und fossil bekannten Geckotaxa (Reptilia: Gekkonomorpha)". Gekkota 2: 28–153. (Pristurus phillipsii, p. 106). (in German).

Pristurus
Geckos of Africa
Reptiles of Somalia
Endemic fauna of Somalia
Reptiles described in 1895
Taxa named by George Albert Boulenger